John Monte is the bassist for Evan Seinfeld's new band, The Spyderz. He was a bassist for M.O.D., Mind Funk, Ministry, Human Waste Project and a guitarist for Dragpipe, Handful of Dust and Evil Mothers.

References 

Year of birth missing (living people)
Living people
Mind Funk members
Ministry (band) members
American rock bass guitarists
American male bass guitarists
American male guitarists
M.O.D. members